A jet-setter is a member of the Jet Set.

Jetsetter or jet setter may also refer to:

 JET SETTER, the call sign for Jet Aviation
 Jetsetter, a travel brand of TripAdvisor
 Jetsetter, a travel website under Gilt Groupe
 "Jetsetter", a song by Fran Cosgrave and the Inner City Playboys 
 "Jetsetter", a song by Morningwood on Morningwood (album)
 "Jetsetter", a song by A Loss For Words